Ornipholidotos peucetia, the large glasswing or white mimic, is a butterfly of the family Lycaenidae. It is found in southern and south-eastern Africa.

The wingspan is 35–37 mm for males and females. Adults are on wing from November to May with a peak in late summer. There is one generation per year.

The larvae feed on cyanobacteria species.

Subspecies
 Ornipholidotos peucetia peucetia (south-western Uganda, Rwanda, Tanzania, Malawi, Zambia, Mozambique, eastern Zimbabwe, Democratic Republic of the Congo: Lualaba, Haut-Shaba)
 Ornipholidotos peucetia peuceda (Grose-Smith, 1889) (southern Somalia, Kenya, eastern Tanzania)
 Ornipholidotos peucetia penningtoni (Riley, 1944) (South Africa: KwaZulu-Natal to the north)

References

Butterflies described in 1866
Ornipholidotos
Butterflies of Africa
Taxa named by William Chapman Hewitson